John Sudarsky Rosebaum  (born February 19, 1947) is an industrial engineer, psychologist, teacher and Colombian businessman. Attached to the Green Party, Sudarsky was elected as a senator and served in that position between 2010 and 2014, along with the support in the Chamber of Representatives of his colleague and fellow political community Angela Maria Robledo, he also formed the dissidence of his party, created in opposition to the alliance of said community with former President Álvaro Uribe.

He is currently president of the Corporation for Social Control (Contrial) which he founded in 2013. Contrial is a civil society organization committed to building a democratic system with an informed, participatory citizenry, active in social control and management.

Early life 
Sudarsky is the son of Jewish immigrants, who initially settled in the coffee region, where he was born Armenia, Quindio. They would later move to Bogota, where Sudarsky currently lives.

Senate of Colombia (2010 - 2014)

2010 election 

For the period 2010–2014, by the visionary wing of the Green Party, he was elected Senator of the Republic. He is the co-author of the Statutory Law of Participation (Law 1757 of 2015) which has become an important tool for citizen participation in Colombia. During his time in the first commission, he presented the paper and managed to get the law that seeks to ban violence against women in the midst of the conflict approved in plenary session of the Senate. In the sixth commission he made important debates on the SENA (National Learning Service), science and technology and secondary education. He also exercised political control over the attempt to reform justice and denounced the attempt to establish impunity with it. He is also manager of the Law against drunk driving (Law 1696 of 2013).

As Senator, he formulated the Draft Legislative Act to Reform the electoral system, based on the Proposal for a Mixed Electoral System (SEM) that arises as an answer to the question: What instead of clientelism? This is how the SEM Proposal is presented as an alternative to combat patronage and corruption, and proposes that for the election of the legislative branch the election by smaller territories (Single-member Districts or DUN's) be combined with the election by section proportional to restore the proportionality between votes and seats that the uninominal system punishes to the detriment of political parties and minorities. This allows for an electoral system where there is representation (on the one hand, citizens know who represents them and therefore can carry out social control and demand accountability in a more forceful and effective way, and on the other hand, the representatives know to whom and on what to render accounts) and proportionality between votes and seats.

2014 Presidential election 
In March 2014, he participated in the consultation to choose a presidential candidate for the Alianza Verde Party, in which he obtained 350,000 votes.

John Sudarsky has participated in the foundation of political movements that have managed to give a new dynamic to the country. This is the case of the New Liberalism Movement that he helped consolidate together with Luis Carlos Galán. He is also one of the founders of the Visionaries for Colombia Movement, which shares the political convictions of Antanas Mockus, of whom he was Participatory Planning Counselor 2001–2003, during his second term as Mayor of Bogotá.

Education 
Senator John Sudarsky is a Doctor of Education from Harvard University, which gives him great academic authority in his positions on education in Colombia. Among others he proposes:

 Create the Superintendence of Education
 Improve the quality of secondary education, with a massive teacher training program and infrastructure expansion.
 Promote a career for teachers based on a decent salary, selection of the best teachers and continuous evaluation of academic results.
 Reform the mobility routes of education so that the chain between secondary and higher education facilitates the training of citizens and the recognition of the technical baccalaureate, through credits, to access higher education, where SENA plays a fundamental role.

References

1947 births
Living people
University of Los Andes (Colombia) alumni
University of Kansas alumni
Harvard Graduate School of Education alumni